Smile Please may refer to:

Smile Please (company), a Japanese production company
Smile Please (2014 film), an Indian Oriya-language film
Smile Please (2017 film), an Indian Kannada-language film
Smile Please (2019 film), an Indian Marathi-language film
"Smile Please", a 1970 Herman's Hermits song, B-side to the single "Years May Come, Years May Go"

See also
"Say Cheese (Smile Please)", a 2003 song by British band Fast Food Rockers